Nasser Yousefi (born 1967) is an Iranian writer and novelist. He is a recipient of several national and international awards including  Iran's Book of the Year and Iranian Best Children's Book Award.

Books
 Yasaman and Souvenir
 Cook-a-doodle-do; It's Morning
 Yasaman's Sneakers
 The Apple Tree
 The Special Day
 Yasaman and the Chicks
 Moon-Brow
 Turning Green (English version published 2021)

See also
Persian literature

References

External links
Good Books, Bad Books—and Who Decides Why by Nasser Yusefi

Iranian novelists
1967 births
Living people
Iranian children's writers
Iranian short story writers